Hewa, also known as Sisimin and Lagaip, is spoken by the Hewa people. It is a Sepik language of northern Papua New Guinea. It is spoken in Lagaip Rural LLG of Enga Province, and also in Hela Province and Telefomin Rural LLG of Sandaun Province.

References

Languages of Papua New Guinea
Sepik Hill languages